Baron Delamer is a title that has been created twice in British history:

 Booth baronets, created in 1661
 Earl of Stamford, created in 1796

See also 
 Baron Delamere
 Delamere (disambiguation)